Moldova competed at the 2002 Winter Olympics in Salt Lake City, United States.

Biathlon

Men

Women

 1 A penalty loop of 150 metres had to be skied per missed target. 
 3 One minute added per missed target. 
 4 Starting delay based on 7.5 km sprint results.

Cross-country skiing

Men

 C = Classical style, F = Freestyle

Women
Sprint

 C = Classical style, F = Freestyle

Luge

Men

References
Official Olympic Reports
 Olympic Winter Games 2002, full results by sports-reference.com

Nations at the 2002 Winter Olympics
2002
Winter Olympics